Lars Johan Hierta (22 January 1801 – 20 November 1872) was a Swedish newspaper publisher, social critic, businessman and politician. He is best known as the founder of the newspaper Aftonbladet in 1830. Hierta was a leading agitator for political and social reform in Sweden during the 19th century. He is sometimes credited as the "father of the free press" in Sweden.

Biography

Hierta was born to a noble family – the Hierta family – in Uppsala, Sweden, as the son of Carl Didrik Hierta and Hedvig Johanna Schméer. He received his primary education at a private school and began his studies at Uppsala University in 1814, where he earned a Doctor of Philosophy and a Candidate of Law in 1821. In the same year he was employed as an unpaid trainee at the central government agency Bergskollegium, where he was promoted as a law clerk in 1825.

In the mid-1820s, Hierta met Wilhelmina Fröding, his future wife. Although her family rejected his initial marriage proposal, they married in 1833 and together had five daughters.

At the Riksdag of the Estates of 1823, Hierta served as a secretary at the Swedish House of Lords. At the following Estates Assembly, from 1828 to 1830, he was a representative of the nobility and also served as a law clerk. In the Riksdag, Hierta aligned himself with the liberal opposition critical of the conservative rule of King Charles XIV John. 

Hierta started writing for Conservationsbladet in 1823. He also wrote for the papers Argus from 1824 to 1826 and, sporadically, Stockholmsposten from 1826 to 1828. He started writing as a humourist, later as a news writer and political editorialist.

In 1829, Hierta started the book publishing house Hiertas bokförlag ("Hierta's Publishing House").

In 1830, Hierta founded the Aftonbladet newspaper, where he advocated for a republic (though without using the word "republic"), which is sometimes seen as the start of the Swedish republican movement. The newspaper was banned many times, but published under a new name each time. 

In 1839 Lars Johan Hierta founded a candle factory still active today by the name of Liljeholmens Stearinfabriks AB.

Soon after 1840, Aftonbladet hired Swedish writer and feminist Wendela Hebbe (1808–1899), who became the first permanently-employed woman journalist at a Swedish newspaper. Hierta and Hebbe later had a son together. Both Hierta and Hebbe were socially active for liberal causes.

At the time of his death in Stockholm, Hierta was one of the wealthiest persons in Sweden. After his death, his widow Wilhelmina Fröding Hierta donated 100,000 SEK to Stockholm University for the establishment of a professorship in economics, and later 400,000 SEK to the foundation Lars Hiertas minne ("Lars Hierta's Memory") whose mission was to "work freely and independently for human progress". He is buried in Norra begravningsplatsen.

Further reading

References

External links 

 Aftonbladet under 170 år (in Swedish)

1801 births
1872 deaths
People from Uppsala
Swedish nobility
Uppsala University alumni
Swedish newspaper publishers (people)
19th-century Swedish businesspeople
Members of the Riksdag of the Estates
Members of the Andra kammaren
19th-century Swedish politicians
19th-century Swedish journalists
Male journalists
19th-century male writers
Swedish republicans
Lars Johan
Burials at Norra begravningsplatsen